James Dobson Elementary School is historic elementary school located in the Manayunk neighborhood of Philadelphia, Pennsylvania. It is part of the School District of Philadelphia. The building was designed by Irwin T. Catharine and built in 1929–1930. It is a three-story, five bay, brick building on a raised basement in the Late Gothic Revival-style.  It features an entrance pavilion with stone-trimmed arched opening, and brick piers with stone trim.

The building was added to the National Register of Historic Places in 1988.

References

External links

School buildings on the National Register of Historic Places in Philadelphia
Gothic Revival architecture in Pennsylvania
School buildings completed in 1930
Northwest Philadelphia
School District of Philadelphia
Public K–8 schools in Philadelphia
1930 establishments in Pennsylvania